Balcells is a surname. Notable people with the surname include:

Carlos Balcells, Filipino bass guitarist
Carmen Balcells (1930–2015), Spanish literary agent
Joan Balcells (born 1975), Spanish tennis player
Luis Balcells (1902–1927), Spanish swimmer
Manuel Balcells i Díaz (born 1958), Spanish politician
Pedro Balcells (born 1954), Spanish swimmer
Ramón Balcells (born 1951), Spanish sailor
Ramón Balcells Rodón (1919–1999), Spanish sailor